Adelina Zinurova is an Uzbek water polo player. She was a member of the Uzbekistani women's water polo team.

She competed at the 2009 World Women's Junior Waterpolo Championships, 2010 Asian Games winning a bronze medal, 2011 World Women's Junior Waterpolo Championships, 2013 World Acquatics Championships. and 2014 Asian Games.

References 

Water polo players
Uzbekistani female water polo players
Living people
Place of birth missing (living people)
Asian Games medalists in water polo
Water polo players at the 2010 Asian Games
Water polo players at the 2014 Asian Games
Asian Games bronze medalists for Uzbekistan
Medalists at the 2010 Asian Games
Year of birth missing (living people)
21st-century Uzbekistani women